The English Football League XI was a representative side of the Football League. The team regularly played against the Scottish Football League XI and other national league select teams between 1891 and 1976.

For a long period the annual fixture between the English and Scottish leagues was only second in importance to the matches between the two national teams. The fixture declined in importance, however, particularly after regular European club competition was instituted in the 1950s. Later matches were played irregularly and poorly attended, with the last match against the Scottish league being played in March 1976. Other than the Inter-league fixtures, a match was played against the England national team in 1963 as part of the Football Association's centenary celebrations, ending in a 3–3 draw,

Aside from one-off exhibition matches against the Glasgow Football Association in 1977 (a 2–1 loss, celebrating the Silver Jubilee of Elizabeth II) and against a 'World XI' at Wembley (a 3–0 victory, which was part of the League's centenary celebrations), the Football League XI's most recent games have been against the Italian League, which was a regular fixture through the 1990s and was most recently played as an Under-21 fixture in 2006.

Results by opponent

 P – Played; W – Won; D – Drawn; L – Lost

Notes

References

External links
Matches against the Scottish Football League at London Hearts Supporters Club
England - Football League - International Results at Rec.Sport.Soccer Statistics Foundation 

English Football League
Representative teams of association football leagues
1891 establishments in England
Sports organizations established in 1891